Philautus tytthus is a species of frog in the family Rhacophoridae. It is endemic to northern Myanmar, but its range may extend to adjacent Yunnan (China). It is a little known species that has not been recorded since the type series was collected in the 1930s.

References

tytthus
Amphibians of Myanmar
Endemic fauna of Myanmar
Amphibians described in 1940
Taxonomy articles created by Polbot